Hachiya Dam is an earthfill dam located in Gifu Prefecture in Japan. The dam is used for irrigation. The catchment area of the dam is 20 km2. The dam impounds about 7  ha of land when full and can store 631 thousand cubic meters of water. The construction of the dam was started on 1975 and completed in 1978.

References

Dams in Gifu Prefecture
1978 establishments in Japan